The Gypsy Baron is a 1962 French-German operetta film directed by  and starring Carlos Thompson, Heidi Brühl, and Willy Millowitsch. It is based on the 1885 operetta The Gypsy Baron.

The film was shot at the Spandau Studios in Berlin. Location filming took place in the Serbian capital Belgrade and in Varaždin, Croatia.

Cast

References

External links

1962 musical comedy films
French musical comedy films
German musical comedy films
West German films
Films directed by Kurt Wilhelm
Operetta films
Films based on operettas
Films set in Hungary
Films set in Romania
Films about Romani people
Films shot at Spandau Studios
1960s German films
1960s French films